Bergljot Sandvik-Johansen (27 January 1922 – 9 January 2020) was a Norwegian gymnast who competed in the 1952 Summer Olympics. She married the former speed skater Aage Johansen (1919–2012) and together they had a daughter, national figure skating champion and 1964 Olympian Berit Unn Johansen and a son Stein Erik Johansen.

References

External links
 

1922 births
2020 deaths
Norwegian female artistic gymnasts
Norwegian female pair skaters
Olympic gymnasts of Norway
Gymnasts at the 1952 Summer Olympics
20th-century Norwegian women